Events from the year 1946 in Belgium

Incumbents
Monarch: Leopold III, with Prince Charles as regent
Prime Minister: 
 Achille Van Acker (to 13 March)
 Paul-Henri Spaak (13 March to 31 March)
 Achille Van Acker (31 March to 3 August)
 Camille Huysmans (from 3 August)

Events
 17 February – Legislative elections
 24 February – Provincial elections
 12 April – Flemish nationalist leader August Borms executed by firing squad as a collaborator
 October – École Royale Technique de la Force Aérienne established outside Sint-Truiden
 24 November – Municipal elections

Publications
 Fernand Baudhuin, Histoire économique de la Belgique, 1914-1939 (Brussels, E. Bruylant)
 Jan Albert Goris, The Growth of the Belgian Nation (New York, N.Y., Belgian Government Information Center)
 Katharine Roberts, And the bravest of these (Garden City, N.Y., Doubleday & Company)

Births

Deaths
 22 September – Marguerite Putsage (born 1868), painter

References

 
Belgium
Years of the 20th century in Belgium
1940s in Belgium
Belgium